David Reidy (born 1993) is an Irish hurler who plays as a midfielder for the Clare senior team.

Born in Ennis, County Clare, Reidy developed his hurling skills at St. Flannan's College while playing at underage levels with the Éire Óg club. Reidy subsequently became a member of the Éire Óg senior team.

Reidy made his début on the inter-county scene at the age of twenty when he first linked up with the Clare u21 team. He made his senior début during the 2014 league. Since then he has won one National Hurling League medal.

Career statistics

Honours

Team

Clare
 National Hurling League (1): 2016

References

1995 births
Living people
Éire Óg, Inis hurlers
Clare inter-county hurlers